The eighth series of Ballando con le Stelle was broadcast from 7 January 2012 to 17 March 2012 on RAI 1 and was presented by Milly Carlucci with Paolo Belli and his Big Band.

Couples

Scoring chart

Red numbers indicate the lowest score for each week.
Green numbers indicate the highest score for each week.
 indicates the couple eliminated that week.
 indicates the returning couples that finished in the bottom two/three was saved by a second public vote.
 indicates the returning couple that finished in the bottom three/four and was saved by the judges.
 indicates the couple who quit the competition.
 indicates the couple was voted back into the competition.
 indicates the couple was voted back into the competition but then re-eliminated.
 indicates the couple passed to the next round automatically.
 indicates the winning couple.
 indicates the runner-up couple.
 indicates the third-place couple.

Highest and lowest scoring performances of the series 
The best and worst performances in each dance according to the judges' marks are as follows:

Average chart

Average Dance chart

Special Guest 
Individual judges scores in charts below (given in parentheses) are listed in this order from left to right: Ivan Zazzaroni, Fabio Canino, Carolyn Smith and Guillermo Mariotto.

Dance order

Week 1 
Individual judges scores in charts below (given in parentheses) are listed in this order from left to right: Ivan Zazzaroni, Fabio Canino, Carolyn Smith and Guillermo Mariotto.

Week 2 
Individual judges scores in charts below (given in parentheses) are listed in this order from left to right: Ivan Zazzaroni, Fabio Canino, Carolyn Smith and Guillermo Mariotto.

Week 3 
Individual judges scores in charts below (given in parentheses) are listed in this order from left to right: Ivan Zazzaroni, Fabio Canino, Carolyn Smith and Guillermo Mariotto.

Week 4 
Individual judges scores in charts below (given in parentheses) are listed in this order from left to right: Ivan Zazzaroni, Fabio Canino, Carolyn Smith and Guillermo Mariotto.

Week 5

Week 6

Week 7 
Individual judges scores in charts below (given in parentheses) are listed in this order from left to right: Ivan Zazzaroni, Fabio Canino, Carolyn Smith and Guillermo Mariotto.

Week 8 
Individual judges scores in charts below (given in parentheses) are listed in this order from left to right: Ivan Zazzaroni, Fabio Canino, Carolyn Smith and Guillermo Mariotto.

Week 9 
Individual judges scores in charts below (given in parentheses) are listed in this order from left to right: Ivan Zazzaroni, Fabio Canino, Carolyn Smith and Guillermo Mariotto.

Week 10 
Individual judges scores in charts below (given in parentheses) are listed in this order from left to right: Ivan Zazzaroni, Fabio Canino, Carolyn Smith and Guillermo Mariotto.

Bottom 3/4

Week 1

Week 2

Week 3

Week 4

Week 5

Week 6

Week 7

Week 9

Call-out order
The table below lists the order in which the contestants' fates were revealed. The order of the safe couples doesn't reflect the viewer voting results.

 This couple came in first place with the judges.
 This couple came in last place with the judges.
 This couple came in last place with the judges and was eliminated.
 This couple came in first place with the judges and was eliminated.
 This couple was eliminated.
 This couple was voted back into the competition.
 This couple was voted back into the competition but then re-eliminated.
 This couple passed to the next round automatically.
 This couple won the competition.
 This couple came second in the competition.
 This couple came third in the competition.

Dance chart

 Highest Scoring Dance
 Lowest Scoring Dance

References
Official website of Ballando con le Stelle 

08
2012 Italian television seasons